The Legislature XV of Italy started on 28 April 2006 and ended on 28 April 2008. Its composition resulted from the election of 9–10 April 2006, called after President Ciampi dissolved the houses on 11 February 2006, at the end of the previous legislature. This legislature was the second shortest in the history of the Italian Republic, lasting exactly two years, and ending when President Giorgio Napolitano dissolved the houses on 6 February 2008, after a vote of no confidence on the incumbent Prodi Cabinet.

The election was the first one with the new preferential block electoral system (also known as Porcellum) introduced by Roberto Calderoli in 2005, and later declared partially unconstitutional by the Constitutional Court.

Government

Composition

Chamber of Deputies

The number of elected deputies is 630.

 President: Fausto Bertinotti (PRC), elected on 29 April 2006
 Vice Presidents: Pierluigi Castagnetti (L'Ulivo, then PD), Carlo Leoni (L'Ulivo, then SD), Giulio Tremonti (FI), Giorgia Meloni (AN)

Senate

The number of elected senators was 315. At the start of the Legislature the number of life senators was seven (Francesco Cossiga and Oscar Luigi Scalfaro as former Presidents, as well as nominated life senators Giulio Andreotti, Rita Levi-Montalcini, Emilio Colombo, Giorgio Napolitano, and Sergio Pininfarina). During the legislature Giorgio Napolitano was elected President, thus leaving his seat as life senator. Carlo Azeglio Ciampi became life senator on 15 May 2006 as the former President.

 President: Franco Marini (L'Ulivo, then PD), elected on 29 April 2006
 Vice Presidents: Gavino Angius (L'Ulivo, then SD), Roberto Calderoli (LN), Milziade Caprili (PRC), Mario Baccini (UdC)

References

Legislatures of Italy